Cory Carter (born March 5, 1994) is a former American football punter. He played college football at Texas Southern.

Professional career

Houston Texans
On January 2, 2017, Carter signed a reserve/future contract with the Houston Texans. He was waived on September 2, 2017.

Buffalo Bills
On December 5, 2017, Carter was signed to the Buffalo Bills' practice squad. He signed a reserve/future contract with the Bills on January 8, 2018. Carter entered the 2018 preseason competing with veteran Colton Schmidt. In the second preseason game, Carter suffered a knee injury after being hit following a punt. He was diagnosed with a torn ACL the following day and was then placed on injured reserve.

On August 26, 2019, Carter was released by the Bills.

St. Louis BattleHawks
Carter signed with the St. Louis BattleHawks of the XFL on March 9, 2020. He had his contract terminated when the league suspended operations on April 10, 2020.

References

External links
Houston Texans bio

1994 births
Living people
American football punters
Buffalo Bills players
Houston Texans players
People from Raymond, Mississippi
Players of American football from Mississippi
St. Louis BattleHawks players
Texas Southern Tigers football players